M. G. Ramachandran (1917–1987) was the Former Chief Minister of Tamil Nadu.

MGR may also refer to:

 ManaGeR (MGR), graphical window system
 Merry-go-round train, British freight-train design

Mgr. is an honorific or abbreviation for:
 Manager (disambiguation) 
 Monseigneur (also Msgr.) 
 Monsignor (also Msgr., Mons.)